Mohammed Bello or Muhammad Bello is a common Fulani name, which may refer to:

Muhammed Bello (1781–1837), Sultan of Sokoto, 1814–1836
Mohammed Bello (1930–2004), Chief Justice of Nigeria, 1987–1995
Haliru Mohammed Bello (born 1945), Nigerian statesman and politician
Mohammed Adamu Bello (born 1957), Nigerian politician and businessman
Mohammed Bello Adoke (born 1963), Minister of Justice, 2010–2015
Mohammed Musa Bello (born 1959), Minister of the Federal Capital Territory, 2015–present
Mohammed Bello Abubakar (1924–2017), Nigerian polygamist